8 Lust Songs: I Sonetti Lussuriosi is a setting by Michael Nyman of 8 pieces of a collection of erotic poetry from Pietro Aretino’s I Sonetti Lussuriosi.  The songs depict a man and woman's sexual desires for one another in varying contexts.  Marie Angel premiered the piece, voicing both the male and female characters, including a voyeuristic old woman, with the Orchestra di Santa Cecilia, conducted by the composer, on 4 October 2007 at the Arsenale in Venice, Italy, on a commission from Venice Biennale.  A studio recording with the Michael Nyman Band was released on compact disc 29 July 2008.  It is Nyman's 59th album, and the twelfth on his own label.

In a concert on 8 May 2008, the printed programs for a performance of the work at Cadogan Hall were withdrawn on the grounds that they contained obscene content.  The U.S. release of the album has a very large Parental Advisory Explicit Content sticker directly on the jewel case, an extreme rarity in classical music (shared with John Moran's The Manson Family, which was quickly withdrawn and became a collectible).

Track listing
Questo cazzo voglio io
Fottiamoci anima mia
Io 'l voglio in cul tu mi perdonerai
Tu pur a gambe in collo in cul me l'hai
Dammi la lingua
E saria pur una coglioneria
Mettimi un dito in cul caro vecchione
Apri le coscie, accio ch'io veggia bene

Personnel
Gabrielle Lester, violin
Catherine Thompson, violin
Kate Musker, viola
Tony Hinnigan, cello
Martin Elliott, bass guitar
David Roach, saxophone
Simon Haram, saxophone
Andrew Findon, saxophone
Steve Sidwell, trumpet
David Lee, horn
Nigel Barr, bass trombone
Michael Nyman, piano
Marie Angel, soprano

External links
  Reflections by the composer, quoted on the Naxos blog

References

2008 albums
Michael Nyman albums